Jadon Laird Lavik (born May 23, 1978) is an American contemporary Christian music singer-songwriter, formerly signed with BEC Recordings.

Background
Born in Redmond, Washington, Lavik's parents are Philip and Christine. He has an older brother, Justin, and a younger sister, Anna.

Lavik was on the If I Had One Chance to Tell You Something Tour with Rebecca St. James and BarlowGirl in early 2006 to promote his album, Life on the Inside.

Discography

Albums

Compilation appearances
2004: "Redeeming King" on Empty Me

Critical response
Life on the Inside received positive reviews from Jesus Freak Hideout and Christianity Today.

Personal life
Lavik is married and lives in San Clemente, California.

References

External links
 
 Biography at cmcentral.com
 Review at Christianity Today
 Review at Jesus Freak Hideout

1978 births
American performers of Christian music
American singer-songwriters
BEC Recordings artists
Living people
21st-century American singers